Douglas Mackie  (born February 18, 1957 in Malden, Massachusetts) is a former offensive tackle who played for the New York Giants and Atlanta Falcons of the National Football League and the Tampa Bay Bandits and New Jersey Generals of the United States Football League College & Pro Football Newsweekly All-Pro 2nd team 1984–85; helped running back Herschel Walker achieve pro football rushing record 2,000+ yards.

References 

1957 births
Living people
American football offensive linemen
New York Giants players
Atlanta Falcons players
Tampa Bay Bandits players
New Jersey Generals players
Ohio State Buckeyes football players
People from Saugus, Massachusetts
Sportspeople from Essex County, Massachusetts
Players of American football from Massachusetts
National Football League replacement players